Pattikkad is a town near Perinthalmanna , in Malappuram district of Kerala, in southwestern India. It is situated at about 5 km from Perinthalmanna, in the
Valancheri- Perinthalmanna-Nilambur road. The railway station is on the Shoranur-Nilambur Railway Line. There are two Arabic colleges.

Transportation
Pattikkad connects to other parts of India through Perinthalmanna town.  National highway No.66 passes through Tirur and the northern stretch connects to Goa and Mumbai.  The southern stretch connects to Cochin and Trivandrum.   Highway No.966 goes to Palakkad and Coimbatore.   The nearest airport is at Kozhikode.  The nearest major railway station is at Shoranur Junction.  The nearest  railway 
station is at Pattikkad railway station.

References

Cities and towns in Malappuram district
Perinthalmanna area